Luke Chambers (born 24 June 2004) is an English professional  footballer who plays as a left-back for Scottish Premiership club Kilmarnock, on loan from  club Liverpool. He was part of the England national under-19 football team that won the 2022 UEFA European Under-19 Championship.

Club career

Early years
From Preston, Lancashire, Chambers joined the Liverpool Academy when he was six years old. After moving through the  age group teams, when he was aged 18 years old Chambers travelled with the first team Liverpool squad on their pre-season tour of Asia where he played in matches against Manchester United and Crystal Palace. He was given a professional contract by Liverpool in July 2022. During the 2022-23 season Chambers began to be involved in the first team squad for Premier League matches and being named among the match day substitutes. 

In September 2022 Chambers was name-checked by Liverpool’s first team assistant manager Pepijn Lijnders, along with Bobby Clark and Stefan Bajcetic, as “stand out" players from the Liverpool Youth Team. He also impressed Liverpool first team left-back Kostas Tsimikas who said “This kid [Chambers] impresses me a lot. He’s a very, very good player and always very focused in the training. For me, my personal advice for him is to never stop dreaming and never stop working hard, because in football that's the most important [thing]. I'm really sure the future is bright for him.”

Kilmarnock loan
On 30 January 2023, Chambers joined Scottish Premiership club Kilmarnock on loan until the end of the season. Chambers made his senior debut on Wednesday February 1, 2023 against Dundee United F. C.
and provided the assist for the only
goal of the game. Afterward he received praise from manager Derek McInnes who said it was a “great debut” and added that Chambers “was making his senior debut at 18, there was a lot of nerves, but the level of performance was very mature”.

International career
Chambers was part of the England under-19 squad that won the 2022 UEFA European Under-19 Championship held in Slovakia in June and July 2022. He was a second-half substitute in the final as England defeated Israel in extra time to win the tournament. He scored his first goal for England U19s in September 2022 against Montenegro U19.

Career statistics

Club

Notes

Honours
England under-19
UEFA European Under-19 Championship: 2022

References

2004 births
Living people
Footballers from Preston, Lancashire
English footballers
England youth international footballers
Association football defenders
Liverpool F.C. players
Scottish Professional Football League players
Kilmarnock F.C. players